Mad Shadows was the second album by Mott the Hoople. It was recorded in 1970 and released in the UK on Island Records in September 1970 (catalogue number ILPS 9119) and in the US by Atlantic Records (cat. no. SD 8272). It was subsequently re-released by Angel Air in 2003 (SJPCD158). As with their debut album, it was produced by Guy Stevens.

The original pressing reached No. 48 in the UK Albums Chart in October 1970.

Critical reception
Stephen Thomas Erlewine of AllMusic gave the album two stars out of five and stated:

Track listing
All songs written by Ian Hunter except where noted.

Side one
 "Thunderbuck Ram" (Mick Ralphs) – 4:51
 "No Wheels to Ride" – 5:49
 "You Are One of Us" – 2:22
 "Walkin' with a Mountain" – 3:52

Side two
 "I Can Feel" – 7:15
 "Threads of Iron" (Ralphs) – 5:11
 "When My Mind's Gone" – 6:25

 Note: the times on the sleeve and record centre on early pressings are incorrect for "No Wheels To Ride" (listed as 6:02), "You Are One Of Us" (listed as 3:22) and "Threads Of Iron" (listed as 5:51). The times above are correct.

2003 CD bonus tracks
 "It Would Be a Pleasure" (Ralphs) – 1:50
 "How Long? (Death May Be Your Santa Claus)" (Hunter, Verden Allen) – 3:54

Personnel
Mott the Hoople
 Ian Hunter – lead vocals (tracks 2-5, 7-9), co-lead vocals (6), piano, rhythm guitar
 Mick Ralphs – lead guitar, backing vocals, lead vocals (track 1), co-lead vocals (6)
 Pete "Overend" Watts – bass, backing vocals
 Dale "Buffin" Griffin – drums, backing vocals
 Verden Allen – organ, backing vocals

Additional personnel
 Guy Stevens – "psychic" piano, "spiritual" percussion

Technical
 Guy Stevens – producer
 Andy Johns – engineer
 Ginny Smith, Peter Sanders – cover design
 Gabi Naseman – front cover photography

Charts

References

1970 albums
Mott the Hoople albums
Albums produced by Guy Stevens
Island Records albums
Albums recorded at Olympic Sound Studios